Galbert of Bruges (Galbertus notarius Brugensis in Latin) was a Flemish cleric and chronicler. A resident of Bruges and a functionary in the administration  of the count of Flanders, he is known for his day-by-day Latin account De multro, traditione et occisione gloriosi Karoli comitis Flandriarum of the events surrounding the murder of Count Charles the Good, in 1127 and its aftermath up through the accession of Thierry of Alsace in summer 1128.

References
Jeff Rider (translator). 2013. The Murder, Betrayal, and Slaughter of the Glorious Charles, Count of Flanders by Galbert of Bruges. New Haven and London: Yale University Press. .
Jeff Rider (editor). 1994. De multro, traditione, et occisione gloriosi Karoli comitis Flandriarum. Turnhout, Belgium: Brepols. . 
Jeff Rider. 2001. God's Scribe: The Historiographical Art of Galbert of Bruges. Washington, DC: Catholic University of America Press. .
Jeff Rider and Alan V. Murray (editors). 2009. Galbert of Bruges and the Historiography of Medieval Flanders. Washington, DC: Catholic University of America Press. .
James Bruce Ross (translator) (2005), The murder of Charles the Good by Galbert of Bruges [first issued 1953]

External links
deremilitari.org
home.cc.umanitoba.ca

1134 deaths
Chroniclers from the Holy Roman Empire
12th-century historians from the Holy Roman Empire
Year of birth unknown
12th-century Latin writers